Percy Mayfield (August 12, 1920August 11, 1984) was an American Rhythm and blues singer with a smooth vocal style. He also was a songwriter, known for the songs "Please Send Me Someone to Love" and "Hit the Road Jack", the latter being a song first recorded by Ray Charles.

Career
Mayfield was born in Minden, Louisiana, the seat of Webster Parish, in the northwestern part of the state. As a youth, he had a talent for poetry, which led him to songwriting and singing. He began his performing career in Texas and then moved to Los Angeles in 1942, but without success as a singer until 1947, when a small record label, Swing Time Records, signed him to record his song "Two Years of Torture," with a band that included the saxophonist Maxwell Davis, the guitarist Chuck Norris, and the pianist Willard McDaniel. The record sold steadily over the next few years, prompting Art Rupe to sign Mayfield to his label, Specialty Records, in 1950.

Mayfield's vocal style was influenced by such stylists as Charles Brown, but unlike many West Coast bluesmen, Mayfield did not focus on the white market. He sang blues ballads, mostly songs he wrote himself, in a gentle vocal style. His most famous song, "Please Send Me Someone to Love", a number one R&B hit single in late 1950, described by the reviewer Bill Dahl as "a multi-layered universal lament", was widely influential and recorded by many other singers. His career flourished as a string of six Top 10 R&B hits followed, like "Lost Love" and "The Big Question", confirming his status as a leading blues ballad singer and "a true master at expressing his innermost feelings, laced with vulnerability and pathos".

In 1952, at the height of his popularity, Mayfield was severely injured in an automobile crash, when he was returning from a performance in Las Vegas to Los Angeles as the front-seat passenger in a chauffeur-driven car. The vehicle hit the back of an unseen stationary truck, and Mayfield was hit by debris. Though pronounced dead at the scene, he eventually recovered but spent two years convalescing. The accident left him with a facial disfigurement that eventually ended his career as a performer but did not halt his prolific songwriting. He continued to write and record for Specialty, and after 1954 he recorded for Chess Records and Imperial Records.

In 1961, Mayfield's song "Hit the Road Jack" brought him to the attention of Ray Charles, who signed him to his Tangerine Records, primarily as a songwriter. Mayfield wrote "Hide nor Hair", "At the Club", "Danger Zone", and "But on the Other Hand, Baby" for Tangerine, and Charles, who had him signed to a five-year contract as his private songwriter, recorded at least 15 of his songs. He also had a series of single releases as a vocalist on Tangerine, produced by Charles, including a remake of "River's Invitation", which crept into the Billboard Hot 100 but reached number 25 on the R&B chart in 1963. Two albums were also released, largely compilations of his singles.

Following his RCA recordings in the early 1970s, Mayfield signed briefly with Atlantic Records, for which the soul and blues artist Johnny "Guitar" Watson produced a minor R&B hit for him, "I Don't Want to Be the President", which spent 5 weeks on the charts in 1974, peaking at 64.

In the early 1980s, the Bay Area keyboardist Mark Naftalin discovered that Mayfield was living in the East Bay area and invited him to collaborate in recordings and to live performances in several Marin County and East Bay clubs. The exposure led to a 1982 studio date for the Dutch company Timeless Records with the Phillip Walker Blues Band, recording the album Hit the Road Again, which was released in 1983. Naftalin later produced the videodocumentary "Percy Mayfield: Poet Laureate of the Blues" featuring Mayfield's performances and testimonies from B. B. King and Ray Charles. Recordings of some performances with Naftalin were also released post-humously in the 1992 album "Percy Mayfield Live".

Personal life
Mayfield married three times. The identity of his first wife is unknown. His second wife was Willie Mae Atlas Mayfield.  His third wife was Tina Mayfield. He began working with Tina (born Earnestine Jermany, October 17, 1929 - d. December 14, 2006), also a blues musician, when she moved to Los Angeles in 1972; they became married in 1984, and he died later that year.

Percy had one child, Pamela.

Percy Mayfield died of a heart attack while at home in Los Angeles on August 11, 1984, one day before his 64th birthday. At his funeral, Little Richard performed “Thank You, Jesus” and “Swing Low, Sweet Chariot”. He was interred at Inglewood Park Cemetery, in Inglewood, California.

Discography

Albums

Singles

References

External links

"Strange Things Happen: Percy Mayfield". JammUpp, vol 2, issue 33

1920 births
1984 deaths
American blues singer-songwriters
Imperial Records artists
Chess Records artists
Specialty Records artists
Tangerine Records artists
Urban blues musicians
Recorded In Hollywood artists
West Coast blues musicians
Writers from Minden, Louisiana
Blues musicians from Louisiana
Burials at Inglewood Park Cemetery
20th-century American singers
Singer-songwriters from Louisiana